Semey, until 2007 known as Semipalatinsk and in 1917–1920 as Alash-kala (Alaş-qala), is a city in eastern Kazakhstan, in the Kazakh part of Siberia. When Abai Region was created in 2022, Semey became its administrative centre. Its population is

History

The first Russian settlement in the area dates from 1718, when Russia built a fort beside the river Irtysh, near the ruins of an ancient Buddhist monastery, where seven buildings could be seen. The fort (and later the city) was named Semipalatinsk (Russian for "Seven-Chambered City") after the monastery. The fort suffered frequently from flooding caused by snowmelt swelling the Irtysh.

A small city developed around the fort, and largely served the river trade between the nomadic peoples of Central Asia and the growing Russian Empire. The construction of the Turkestan-Siberia Railway in the early 20th century added to the city's importance, making it a major point of transit between Central Asia and Siberia. On 19 May 1854, Semipalatinsk was designated as the capital of the Semipalatinsk Oblast within the Russian Empire.

Between 1917 and 1920, the city operated as the capital of the largely unrecognized Alash Autonomy, a state (1917–1920) established after the outbreak of the October revolution in Russia. The city was called Alash-qala during the Alash Autonomy years. Red Army forces loyal to Petrograd took control of the area in 1920. It was the center of the  until 17 January 1928, then of the Eastern Kazakhstan Oblast between 17 January 1928 and 14 October 1939 and finally of the Semipalatinsk Oblast between 1939 and 1997.

For decades, Kurchatov (the secret city at the heart of the test range named for Igor Kurchatov, father of the Soviet atomic bomb) was home to many of the brightest stars of Soviet weapons science. The Soviet Union operated the Semipalatinsk Test Site (STS) from the first explosion in 1949 until 1989; 456 nuclear tests, including 340 underground and 116 atmospheric tests, took place there.

Some land around Semey has suffered  environmental and health effects from the time of its atomic prosperity: nuclear fallout from the atmospheric tests and uncontrolled exposure of the workers, some of whom lived in the area close to the testsite, have resulted in high rates of cancer, childhood leukemia, and birth defects among the residents of  neighbouring villages.

Modern Semey, a bustling university town, has a population exceeding 350,000. Because of its proximity to the Kazakh border with the Russian Federation, and the large scientific community attached to the STS labs and the university, which includes many Russians, Semey is said to have a more Russian character than other cities in Kazakhstan.

Semipalatinsk Oblast merged with the larger East Kazakhstan Region, whose capital city is Oskemen, on 23 May 1997.

The Semey Bridge, a suspension bridge across the Irtish River, connects the two major parts of Semey. Construction began in 1998 and the bridge opened to traffic in November 2000.

In 2007 the Semipalatinsk City Council voted unanimously in favour of changing the name of the city to Semey. The Chairman said that existing name had negative associations because of the extensive atomic testing there.

In March 2022, Semey was selected by President Tokayev as the prospective capital of the new Abay Region. This came into force on 8 June 2022 when Abay Region became an official Region of Kazakhstan.

Climate

Semey has a warm-summer humid continental climate (Köppen climate classification Dfb) with warm summers and very cold winters. Snow is common, though light, in winter.

Transportation 

Semey is situated at the Turkestan–Siberia Railway and offers connections to Almaty (former Alma-Ata), Barnaul, and Novosibirsk, among others.

Famous residents
Abay Qunanbayuli, father of modern Kazakh poetry, received his Russian schooling at Semey.
Fyodor Dostoyevsky, writer, was a political exile here for five years (1854–1859), serving in the military as a corporal in the Seventh Line Battalion at the Semipalatinsk garrison. Residents say that details of some descriptive passages in Dostoyevsky's subsequent books, including his highly acclaimed The Brothers Karamazov, are recognizable as taken from his time in Semey.
Pavel Bazhov, writer, was a member of the Party Committee of the province of Semipalatinsk from 1920 to 1923.
Stanislav Kurilov (1936–1998), scientist, grew up in Semipalatinsk. An oceanographer and a good swimmer, he defected from the USSR in 1974 by jumping off a cruise liner in the open ocean and swimming to the Philippines.
Wladimir Klitschko, a boxer in Ukraine, was born here in 1976.
Sergey Letov, Russian saxophonist, was born here.
Vladimir Lisitsin, footballer 
ZaQ (Dulat Bolatuly Muhametkali), singer and a member of the famous Kazakh boyband, Ninety One, was born here in 1996.

The city has a museum to commemorate Abay Qunanbayuli.

Both a museum and a street are named after Dostoyevsky. The Museum of F. M. Dostoevsky in Semey was opened on 7 May 1971. It was established by the Resolution of the Council of Ministers of the Kazakh SSR N 261. Of the seven museums devoted to Dostoevsky, this is the only one located outside Russia.

Population

Higher education

Semey is famous for its intellectual medical community with leading Semey Medical University which provides the region and the country with highly professional health specialists.

International relations

Twin towns and sister cities
Semey is twinned with:
 Ypres, Belgium

See also
Anti-nuclear movement in Kazakhstan

References

External links

Official site
Britannica.com

 
Cities and towns in Kazakhstan
Populated places established in 1718
Populated places in Abai Region
Science and technology in the Soviet Union
Semipalatinsk Oblast
1718 establishments in Russia
Populated places on the Irtysh River